A widow is a woman whose husband has died; a widower is a man whose wife has died.

Widow, The Widow, Widow's, or Widower may also refer to:

Arts, entertainment, and media

TV and film
 The Widow (1939 film), an Italian drama film
 The Widow (1955 film), an Italian romantic drama film
 The Widow (TV series), a British television drama released on Amazon Prime in 2019
 Widows (TV series), a British television drama written by Lynda La Plante, aired in 1983 and 1985
 Widows (2011 film), an Argentine comedy-drama film
 Widows (2018 film), an English-language heist film directed by Steve McQueen, adapted from the British TV series
Widow (1976 film), an American TV film
 The Widower (TV series), a 2014 British miniseries

Plays
 The Widow (play), a 17th-century play
 Widows (play), a theatre play with Puerto Rican actor Luis Antonio Ramos

Music
 "The Widow" (song), a 2005 song by The Mars Volta

Other uses
 Widów (disambiguation), several places in Poland
 Widow (typesetting), a final line of a paragraph appearing separately at the top of a page or column
 Widow skimmer, a dragonfly sometimes known simply as Widow
 Widow's succession, a woman who replaces or stands in for her husband in politics 
 Widow's walk, a rooftop platform 
 Widow's weeds (clothing), mourning clothes
 Widow Von'Du, American drag queen

See also
 Black widow (disambiguation)
 White widow (disambiguation)
 The Merry Widow (disambiguation)
 Whydah Gally, a recovered pirate galleon
 Widow's Peak (disambiguation)